Mangowal Gharbi, or West Mangowal in English, is a town and Union Council headquarters in Gujrat District in Punjab province, Pakistan. This town is famous for rice and flour mills, Outclass Marriage Halls as Akbar Marriage Hall Mangowal.

Geography
According to the 2017 Census of Pakistan, its population is 19,735.  Mangowal Gharbi (post code 50640) is situated 19 kilometer away from Gujrat towards west on Sargodha road. The surrounding villages are Gumrali, Dinga, Jahangirpur Chakrian, Kot Matta, and Chah Mughlan. Mangowal Gharbi is a business hub for surrounding villages, due to its location as Gujrat Sarghoda Highway passes through the town.

History
Mangowal west is situated 19 kilometer away from Gujrat towards west on Sargodha Road. Historically, this village and the surrounding villages, such as Goleki, Dinga, Chakrian, Ladha, and Ishra were named after influential Sikh Sardars.

Muslim background
The famous Sufi saint Shah Sharif came here in 17th century. The preaching Muslim Sufi and saint Syed Hafiz Abdul Rahim Shah(Rahma-tul-alaih ) started preaching Islam among the ancient Sikh and Hindu communities of the area and people started converting to Islam. His followers and descendants were appointed to different towns and cities such as, Moin-ud-D-Pur, Madina Sayyedan, Saroki, in the east and all the way to Miana Gondal, Bar Moosa, Mandi Baha-ud-Din, in the west, to convey the message of Islam and the whole region started embracing Islam.

Arian Hindu/Sikh cultural background
Mangowal, Kunjah, Jokalian and Dinga were prominent in the old Hindu and Sikh culture. Mangowal had valuable historical and spiritually esteemed buildings of the ancient community. More than five Manders, an Ashnaan Ghaat (swimming cum bathing pool) with Mander and a huge idol-worship place named as ..Baamda.. were present here. Moreover two great guest houses(Janj-Ghar) and a community center are still present ( Matrooka-waqf-amlaak Board care for nothing). More than seven common water wells were present along with two hammams each attached to every well for bathing purpose but most of the antiques, depicted here, are not available for the new generation because those are demolished, deformed, captivated or used for individual cause.

Generally people here are hard working and now working all over the world. Most of the population belongs to the Kashmiris, Arayin, Sayyed, Jat/Warraich, Waince, Rehmani, and Mirza tribes. Mian Brothers (originally Malik Awan (Mian Muhammad Taj Muazzam and Mian Noor Muazzam) have contributed a lot for the modernization of this town.

A variety of people inhabit here. Approximately half of the population migrated from India after the partition of the subcontinent in 1947. The people are known as Muhajer (mean migrators), who left their property in India to seek freedom and willful Islamic culture.
Due to accelerated economic standards of the town, enormous communication, attractive housing schemes launching and growing day by day, a huge population has permanently been moved in here from the suburbs. Mangowal is now a shopping preferred place for the area as dozens of plaza have been growing here with hundreds of shops and thousands of customers.

Famous personalities of Mangowal 
There is a variety of people who served here (or still serving) for the betterment of community. Some of them are listed here

Mian Noor Muazzam & Mian Taj Muazzam (Donated Land (5 Million current value)to schools , Ex.Chairman U.C.)
Ch. Bahawal Bukhash (Late), MLA
Ch.Muhammad Ikram, Member Zila Council
Ch. Aitezaz Ehsan MPA
Sir Khadim Hussain Tahir (Principal Boys High School, Mangowal gharbi.)
Dr. Mian Mohammed Aslam (Eye specialist)
Haji Ali Hassan Chaudary(business man)

Education
Government Sector Educational Institutions
Govt.High School Mangowal Gharbi. (more than 1200 students)
Govt.Girls High School Mangowal Gharbi. (near 1300 students)
Govt. Boys Degree College Mangowal. 

Private Sector Educational Institutions
The Jinnah School Mangowal Gharbi
 Oxford School System School Mangowal Gharbi
 The Ambition School Mangowal Gharbi
 Alfarabi School Mangowal Gharbi

Health
Government Sector Health Institutions
 Govt. Maternity Hospital Mangowal Gharbi (Lungay Road) MBBS qualified Dr. served
 Basic Health Unit Mangowal Gharbi (Near Anwar Town) MBBS Dr. served in working hours
 Rural Health Dispensary Mangowal Gharbi (Near Lari Adah) MBBS Dr. served in working hours

Serving mankind
The craftsmen of the town have a great sense of serving, creating and entertaining. The quality of mangowal wood works( furniture) is outstanding. Old ages mud-crafts industry is still active and creating various household mud utensils in the town which are regularly exported to various parts of the country. Super kernel Basmatii rice is abundantly produced by the industrious farmers here and processed in modern processing units (more than 16 rice processor units) and frequently exported all over the world to fetch currency exchange for the prosperity of the country.

Accelerated development era
Town and surrounding area has rapidly grown since 2001 up to 2007 during District Government of Gujrat under Ch.Shafaat Hussain of PML(Q). A high profile motorway, water supply, maternity hospital, basic health unit, revamping of roads, streets and ways, provision of gas are valuable services for Illaqa Mangowal. The provision of gas was approved by Governor Lt Gen Khalid Maqbool much before election of Ch Shafat Hussain, because of efforts of Ch Ikram. The person managing the information is requested to consult relevant records before listing.

See also
Mangowal Sharqi

References

Populated places in Gujrat District